Catalanodytes bellesi is a species of beetle in the family Carabidae, the only species in the genus Catalanodytes.

References

Scaritinae